Caesar Reghini (1581–1658) was a Roman Catholic prelate who served as Bishop of Sarsina (1646–1658).

Biography
Caesar Reghini was born in Pontremoli, Italy in 1581.
On 3 December 1646, he was appointed Bishop of Sarsina by Pope Innocent X.
On 16 December 1646, he was consecrated bishop by Marcantonio Franciotti, Cardinal-Priest of Santa Maria della Pace, with Luca Torreggiani, Archbishop of Ravenna, and Ranuccio Scotti Douglas, Bishop of Borgo San Donnino, serving as co-consecrators.

He served as Bishop of Sarsina until his death in 1658.

References

External links and additional sources
 (for Chronology of Bishops)  

17th-century Italian Roman Catholic bishops
Bishops appointed by Pope Innocent X
1581 births
1658 deaths